Abbas Ghasemi (born October 23, 1982) is an Iranian footballer who currently plays for Paykan in Iran Pro League.

Career
Ghasemi has spent his entire career with Zob Ahan. He was suspended for two years from football in 2011 because of doping.

Club career statistics

References

1982 births
Living people
Zob Ahan Esfahan F.C. players
Iranian footballers
Iranian sportspeople in doping cases
Association football goalkeepers